The CA 80 is a dirigible that was developed by the Conrad Airship Company.

Design and development
The CA 80 is an aluminum truss rigid airship formed in the classic "Flying saucer" shape. It features a single rudder and a central shaft running vertically through its center. Helium is contained with internal mylar bags. It was intended to seat up to eight passengers. Three engines are fitted, one for vertical thrust, one for forward and one for directional control. The first prototype was destroyed in a windstorm.

Specifications (CA 80)

References

Airships